Peter Hoffmann (born 2 August 1941) is a West German sprint canoer who competed in the early 1970s. At the 1972 Summer Olympics in Munich, he finished fourth in the C-2 1000 m event.

References
Sports-reference.com profile

1941 births
Canoeists at the 1972 Summer Olympics
German male canoeists
Living people
Olympic canoeists of West Germany
Place of birth missing (living people)